Canthigaster cyanospilota, commonly known as blue-spotted toby, is a species of pufferfish of the family Tetraodontidae. The species is found throughout the Indian Ocean, including the red Sea and Gulf of Aqaba. They feed on a variety of benthic invertebrates and are listed in the IUCN Red List as Least Concern.

References

Fish described in 2008
Taxa named by Luiz A. Rocha
cyanospilota
Taxa named by John Ernest Randall
Taxa named by Jeffrey T. Williams